Pantordanus or Pantordanos, son of Cleander, was hipparch of the ile of Hetairoi of Leugaea from the beginning of the campaign of Alexander the Great. At the Battle of Issus, he occupied at first the left wing but then being transferred (along with the squadron of Peroidas) to the right, just as the battle began (A 2.9.3). Nothing further is known of him. At the battle of Gaugamela both Peroidas and Pantordanus had been replaced.

References
 Who's Who in the Age of Alexander the Great by  Waldemar Heckel 

4th-century BC Greek people
Generals of Alexander the Great
Ancient Macedonian generals
Ancient Elimiotes